The 1912 St. Viator football team represented St. Viator College during the 1912 college football season.  The team compiled a 4–4, but were outscored 229 to 117, largely due to the 7–116 loss to Notre Dame in early October.

Schedule

References

St. Viator
St. Viator Irish football seasons
St. Viator football